Kvassheim Lighthouse is a coastal lighthouse located on the beach at Kvassheim in Hå municipality in Rogaland county, Norway. The original building was established in 1912 and automated in 1984. The old building is now used as a museum and landmark.

The 26,400-candela light emits a white, red, or green light (depending on direction) occulting twice every 8 seconds.

History
The original wooden lighthouse was built in 1912 and it has been inactive since 1990. The building is painted white and the lantern is red. In 2003, the management of the old station was transferred to the Jæren Friluftsråd (Recreation Council), which began restoration work the following winter. The building now includes a cafeteria and a small museum. The site and lighthouse are open daily from late June to mid-August and on Sundays and holidays during the rest of the year except January.

See also

 List of lighthouses in Norway
 Lighthouses in Norway

References

External links
 Norsk Fyrhistorisk Forening 
 Picture of the historical and current Kvassheim Lighthouse

Lighthouses completed in 1912
Lighthouses in Rogaland
Hå
1912 establishments in Norway